Glenea mounieri is a species of beetle in the family Cerambycidae. It was described by Stephan von Breuning in 1956.

Subspecies
 Glenea mounieri latefascicollis Breuning, 1982
 Glenea mounieri mounieri Breuning, 1956

References

mounieri
Beetles described in 1956